Patrick John "Kangaroo Kicker" O'Dea (17 March 1872 – 5 April 1962) was an Australian rules and American football player and coach. An Australian by birth, O'Dea played Australian rules football for the Melbourne Football Club in the Victorian Football Association (VFA).  In 1898 and 1899, O'Dea played American football at the University of Wisconsin–Madison in the United States, where he excelled in the kicking game.  He then served as the head football coach at the University of Notre Dame from 1900 to 1901 and at the University of Missouri in 1902, compiling a career college football record of 19–7–2.

Following his Australian Rules and American Football careers, O'Dea deliberately disappeared from the public eye, however he helped popularise Australian rules football in the United States as a participation sport while working in San Francisco by training schoolchildren in the kicking game.

O'Dea was inducted into the College Football Hall of Fame as a player in 1962.

Early life
O'Dea was born in Kilmore, Victoria, Australia to an Irish-born father and a Victorian-born mother. He was the third child of seven children. As a child he attended Christian Brothers College and Xavier College. As a 16-year-old he received a bronze medallion from the Royal Humane Society of Australasia for rescuing a woman at Mordialloc beach.

Playing career

O'Dea played American football at the University of Wisconsin–Madison, where he was their star fullback from 1896–1899 and captained the 1898 and 1899 teams. In those days fullbacks punted and often did the placekicking. In the 1898 edition of the Northwestern game, which was played in a blizzard, he drop kicked a 62-yard field goal, and had a 116-yard punt. This earned him the nickname "Kangaroo Kicker".

Wisconsin then headed into a Thanksgiving Day showdown with 1898 Western champions Michigan with only the narrow loss to Yale marring their record. New songs were composed for the occasion including “Oh, Pat O’Dea” to the popular tune “Margery”. The chorus ran:

"Oh Pat O’Dea, oh Pat O’Dea, We love you more and more. Oh Pat O’Dea, oh Pat O’Dea, You’re the boy that we adore; Your leg is ever sure and true, And always kicks a goal or two. The team and rooters worship you. Oh Pat O’Dea."

The final verse concluded: 
"To this brave lad forever we shall proudly sing. He is the boy we love. And in the games we play The cry “O’Dea, ”We’ll yell to every foe, because their game will show There is no other lad to see like Pat O’Dea. The East and West will surely have to see That we can’t lose in Patrick’s shoes, For he’s the only boy in all this land so free. The famous punter, Pat O’Dea."

In the 1899 game, he returned a kickoff 90 yards for a touchdown, and had four field goals. He was selected as an All-American team member in 1899.

Coaching career

Notre Dame
From 1900 to 1901, O'Dea coached at the University of Notre Dame, and compiled a 14–4–2 record.

Missouri
O'Dea was the tenth head football coach for the University of Missouri–Columbia Tigers located in Columbia, Missouri and he held that position for the 1902 season.  His career coaching record at Missouri was 5 wins, 3 losses, and no ties.  This ranks him 22nd at Missouri in total wins and tenth at Missouri in winning percentage.

Later life
O'Dea introduced Australian rules at the University of Wisconsin and while working in San Francisco also trained schoolchildren, resulting in the adoption of the field kicking game known as "field ball" by the San Francisco public grammar schools.

He disappeared from public view in 1917, having decided that he didn't like being treated as a celebrity, and it was assumed by Wisconsin fans that O'Dea had died fighting in World War I. In 1934, he was discovered living under an assumed name in California and came back to Wisconsin to a hero's welcome. He later appeared on Bob Hope's All-American football team announcement shows. He was inducted into the College Football Hall of Fame on 3 April 1962. He died the next day at the University of California, San Francisco Medical Center.

Pat O'Dea died on 4 April 1962 at the age of 90 after an illness. While he was in hospital he received a get-well message from President John Kennedy. O'Dea's obituary in the New York Times
commented on his kicking achievements including a 110-yard punt, though against Minnesota in 1897 and not Yale in 1899, and his 62-yard goal against Northwestern in 1898.

Head coaching record

References

External links

 
 O'Dea, Patrick John (Pat) (1872–1962) Australian Dictionary of Biography
 Profile at DemonWiki

1872 births
1962 deaths
19th-century players of American football
American football drop kickers
American football fullbacks
American football punters
Australian players of American football
Melbourne Football Club (VFA) players
Essendon Football Club (VFA) players
Kirksville Osteopaths football coaches
Missouri Tigers football coaches
Notre Dame Fighting Irish football coaches
Wisconsin Badgers football players
College men's track and field athletes in the United States
College Football Hall of Fame inductees
Australian rules footballers from Victoria (Australia)
People educated at Xavier College
Footballers who switched code